The Tawon Car  is a mini car, one of the Indonesian Low Cost Green Car. The naming comes from the philosophy of tawon (wasp), small but can sting likes a bee. Wasp also diligently start to work in early morning.

Uses 

Until end of 2010, most of Tawon cars are used as village public transport or taxis without argometer.

Variants 

At the end of 2010, the company launched Tawon Pickup with 500cc gasoline engine only. In 2013, all Tawon variants use 664cc 2 cylinders 4 stroke engine with gasoline or CNG. Except Chinese engine, all car components are made in Indonesia.
 Tawon Transformer, a pickup for 2 persons and 500 kilograms of goods
 Tawon AutoGas, a city car for 4 persons
 Metro Tawon, a hybrid wagon for carrying persons and goods
 Tawon Niga Taxi
 Health Care Go Around

Sources:

Asianusa
PT Super Gasindo Jaya is a member of Asianusa who use Chinese-produced engine, but all other contents is locally made. As of 2017, the only member of Asianusa in active production is PT Fin Komodo Technology, the others (including Tawon manufacturer) already bankrupt.

See also 

 Fin Komodo
 AMMDes

References 

Car manufacturers of Indonesia
Vehicle manufacturing companies established in 2010
Indonesian companies established in 2010
Transport economics